Kahuitara was one of the great ocean-going, voyaging canoes that was used in the migrations that settled New Zealand in Māori tradition.

It landed at Taranaki under the command of Muruiwi. His people settled the area and travelled north.

Te Kawerau ā Maki traces their ancestry back to those who on Kahuitara and other waka, including Tainui, Aotea, Tokomaru and Kurahaupō.

See also
List of Māori waka

References

Māori waka